Synaptonemal complex protein SC65, also known as Leprecan-like protein 4 (LEPREL4) or nucleolar autoantigen No55, is a protein that in humans is encoded by the LEPREL4 gene.

Function 

This nucleolar protein was first characterized because it was an autoantigen in cases on interstitial cystitis. The protein, with a predicted molecular weight of 50 kDa, appears to be localized in the particulate compartment of the interphase nucleolus, with a distribution distinct from that of nucleolar protein B23. During mitosis it is associated with chromosomes.

References

Further reading